Western Air is a privately owned airline in The Bahamas established in 2001. Western Air is headquartered at the San Andros International Airport on Andros Island, Bahamas. The airline conducts a minimum of 40 flights daily throughout the Bahamas and has plans of opening new international routes from the Bahamas to Haiti, Jamaica, Turks & Caicos, and Fort Lauderdale and West Palm Beach, Florida. The airline operates a mixed fleet of Embraer EMB 145 jet aircraft and Saab 340As.

History

The airline was established in 2001 by the husband-and-wife team, Rex J. Rolle and Shandrice Woodside-Rolle. The Rolles serve as President & CEO and Vice President & COO respectively. Their daughter, Sherrexcia "Rexy" Rolle, is an aviation attorney and serves as Vice President of Operations and General Counsel.

Western Air's fleet increased with the publicized multi-aircraft deal for EMB 145s jets in 2018. The airline is slated to acquire additional jets in 2019 and 2020 to assist with growing airlift demands.

Destinations

Hubs 

Western Air has two major hubs inclusive of private passenger terminals, full service aircraft maintenance facilities and corporate offices located at San Andros International Airport and the second hub at Grand Bahama International Airport, which serves as its northern hub.

As of September 5, 2015 Western Air unveiled its new $6 Million Passenger terminal and maintenance facility in Freeport, Grand Bahama.

Fleet

Current fleet

Historic Fleet

References

External links

 Western Air

Airlines of the Bahamas
Airlines established in 2000
Bahamian brands